Marsa Zayed is a $10 billion redevelopment project in Aqaba, Jordan. Named after Sheikh Zayed Bin Sultan Al Nahyan, the project consists of high-rise, hotels, retail, residential, entertainment and financial districts.  The first phases consists of a residential town and a mosque, which are almost completed. The second phase was part on hold in 2018 while relocation of the Port of Aqaba takes place.

References

Aqaba
Tourist attractions in Jordan